Acceleration Team France is the French team of Formula Acceleration 1, an international racing series. They are run by the Belgian Azerti Motorsport team, owned by Wim Coekelbergs.

History

2014 season 
Drivers: Sergio Campana, Nathanaël Berthon

The team announced Italian driver Sergio Campana as their driver for the inaugural Formula Acceleration 1 round in Portimao. He moved to the Portuguese team for round 2 in Navarra and was replaced by Nathanaël Berthon.

Drivers

Complete Formula Acceleration 1 Results

References

France
National sports teams of France
French auto racing teams